Cameron “Cam” Rast (born January 16, 1970) is a retired American youth international soccer defender and current head coach of the Santa Clara University men’s soccer team.

Youth and collegiate career
Growing up, Rast had a two brothers including his twin, Matt and two sisters. Rast grew up in California where he played soccer with the Santa Clara Sporting Club.  He attended Royal High School in Simi Valley, California.  As a high school soccer player, he was a 1987–1988 Gatorade High School Player of the Year.  After graduating from high school, he attended Santa Clara University where he played four seasons (1988–1991) as a defender under head coach Steve Sampson.  His sophomore year, he was the captain of the Broncos as they made it to the NCAA championship game only to have NCAA officials name Santa Clara and their opponents University of Virginia co-champions after four overtimes.  The next year, Rast suffered a knee injury which knocked him out of most of the season.  However, in 1991, Santa Clara and Virginia met again in the NCAA title game.  This time the game went through four scoreless overtimes before Virginia took the title in penalty kicks.  On an individual level, Rast was named a first team All American in both 1989 and 1991.

Youth international
While still in college, Rast was selected as a member of the U.S. U-20 national team at the 1989 U-20 World Cup.  In that tournament, the U.S. took fourth place.  Not only did Rast go to two NCAA championship games and take fourth in the U-20 World Cup, he also won a gold medal as a member of the U.S. soccer team at the 1991 Pan American Games.  He then capped his career as a youth international as the captain of the U.S. soccer team at the 1992 Summer Olympics.  This team did not experience the same level of success, going 1–1–1 and failed to qualify for the second round.  The following year, he was part of the U.S. team at the 1993 World University Games.

Coaching
Rast was selected in the third round of the 1992 National Professional Soccer League (NPSL) Amateur Draft by the Cleveland Crunch.  However, he has made his name since his collegiate and youth international career as a junior national and college coach.  He served as the assistant coach to John Ellinger for the U.S. U-17 national team from 1997 through the 1999 FIFA U-17 World Championship.  At that competition, the U.S. took fourth place.  He also served as an assistant coach of the U.S. U-23 national (Olympic) team at one of the Olympics.  In 2002, Rast became the head coach of the Santa Clara men’s team, a position he holds today.  In 2006, he was selected as the West Coast Conference Coach of the Year.

Besides coaching Rast is also an executive member of the U.S. Soccer's Board of Directors as well as the soccer member of the Athlete Advisory Council to the U.S. Olympic Committee.

On May 17, 2006 Santa Clara inducted Rast into its Athletic Hall of Fame.

References

External links
 Santa Clara bio

1970 births
Living people
Santa Clara Broncos men's soccer players
Olympic soccer players of the United States
Footballers at the 1992 Summer Olympics
American soccer coaches
All-American men's college soccer players
Santa Clara Broncos men's soccer coaches
United States men's under-20 international soccer players
United States men's under-23 international soccer players
American soccer players
Parade High School All-Americans (boys' soccer)
Pan American Games gold medalists for the United States
Pan American Games medalists in football
Association football defenders
Footballers at the 1991 Pan American Games
Medalists at the 1991 Pan American Games